Sarat Centenary College is a general degree college in Dhaniakhali, in the Hooghly district, West Bengal, India. It was named after one of the greatest Bengali novelists, Sarat Chandra Chattopadhyay, in 1976, firstly as a Junior College, and was later upgraded into a Degree College in 1978. It offers undergraduate courses in arts, Commerce and sciences. It is affiliated to  The University of Burdwan.

Departments

Science
Chemistry(Honours)
Physics(Honours)
Mathematics(Honours)
Botany(Honours)
Zoology(Honours)

Arts and Commerce
Bengali(Honours)
English(Honours)
Sanskrit(Honours)
History(Honours)
Geography(Honours)
Political Science(Honours)
Philosophy(Honours)
Commerce (Accountancy Honours)
Physical Education(General)

Accreditation
The college is recognized by the University Grants Commission (UGC). It was accredited by the National Assessment and Accreditation Council (NAAC), and awarded C++ grade, an accreditation that has since then expired. This college recently got B+ grade when visited by NAAC in October 2016.

See also

References

External links
Sarat Centenary College

Colleges affiliated to University of Burdwan
Educational institutions established in 1978
Universities and colleges in Hooghly district
1978 establishments in West Bengal